Stigmella procrastinella is a moth of the family Nepticulidae. It is found in North America in Virginia, Maine and Ontario.

External links
A taxonomic revision of the North American species of Stigmella (Lepidoptera: Nepticulidae)

Nepticulidae
Moths of North America
Moths described in 1927